Jiuzhaigou County is a county of Sichuan Province, China. It is under the administration of the Ngawa Tibetan and Qiang Autonomous Prefecture. Formerly called Nanping County, it was renamed in 1998 to reflect the fact that the Jiuzhaigou Valley is located within its administration. The county seat, was created in 2013 by the merger of Yongle Town, Yongfeng Township, and Anle Township.

The county consists of nine villages in a valley in Sichuan Province. The main ethnic group in the county is Han, with the second being Tibetan. As of 2015, the county's total population was 67,519.

Administrative divisions
Jiuzhaigou County contains fives towns, seven townships, and two other township-level divisions.

Towns 

Townships 

Other divisions 
Jiuzhaigou County also administers two other township-level divisions: Jiuzhaigou State Ranch and Jiuzhaigou Scenic Spot Authority.

Climate

References

External links
 The official website of Jiuzhaigou County Government

 
Ngawa Tibetan and Qiang Autonomous Prefecture
County-level divisions of Sichuan